Norrie Mine is an abandoned surface mine in Northeastern Ontario, Canada. It is named after L. B. Norrie of New York, who first claimed the mine site.

Development was carried out prior to 1920 with the construction of 10 open pits and a number of diamond drill holes. The primary commodities mined at Norrie were copper and nickel. Secondary commodities included lead, gold, zinc and silver. In 1941,  of diamond drilling was completed under the supervision of R. A. Percy. Picked samples from waste rock dumps were said to contain copper and low nickel values. Sampling in 2005 assayed 0.15% nickel and 3.5% copper.

See also
List of mines in Temagami

References

External links

Mines in Temagami
Strathy Township
Copper mines in Ontario
Nickel mines in Canada
Surface mines in Canada